861 Aïda  is a carbonaceous asteroid from the outer region of the asteroid belt, approximately 65 kilometers in diameter. It was discovered on 22 January 1917, by German astronomer Max Wolf at Heidelberg Observatory in southwest Germany, and given the provisional designation . It was named after the Italian opera Aida.

Orbit and classification 

Aïda is a dark C-type asteroid that orbits the Sun in the outer main-belt at a distance of 2.8–3.5 AU once every 5 years and 7 months (2,030 days). Its orbit has an eccentricity of 0.10 and an inclination of 8° with respect to the ecliptic.

Physical characteristics 

In May 2002, a rotational lightcurve of Aïda was obtained from photometric observations by French amateur astronomer Laurent Bernasconi. Lightcurve analysis gave a well-defined rotation period of 10.95 hours with a brightness variation of 0.32 magnitude.

According to the surveys carried out by the Infrared Astronomical Satellite IRAS, the Japanese Akari satellite, and NASA's Wide-field Infrared Survey Explorer with its subsequent NEOWISE mission, Aïda  measures between 62.24 and 66.85 kilometers in diameter, and its surface has an albedo between 0.0571 and 0.7. The Collaborative Asteroid Lightcurve Link derives an albedo of 0.0522 and a diameter of 66.78 kilometers with an absolute magnitude of 9.7.

Naming 

This minor planet was named for Aida, the famous Italian opera in four acts by composer Giuseppe Verdi (1813–1901), after whom the asteroid 3975 Verdi was named. Naming citation was first mentioned in The Names of the Minor Planets by Paul Herget in 1955.

References

External links 
 Asteroid Lightcurve Database (LCDB), query form (info )
 Dictionary of Minor Planet Names, Google books
 Asteroids and comets rotation curves, CdR – Observatoire de Genève, Raoul Behrend
 Discovery Circumstances: Numbered Minor Planets (1)-(5000) – Minor Planet Center
 
 

000861
Discoveries by Max Wolf
Named minor planets
861 Aida
19170122